Lost is an American television drama that debuted on the American Broadcasting Company (ABC) on September 22, 2004. The series aired for six seasons, and follows the survivors of the crash of the fictional Oceanic Flight 815 on a mysterious tropical island somewhere in the South Pacific. Although a large cast made Lost more expensive to produce, the writers benefited from added flexibility in story decisions. According to series executive producer Bryan Burk, "You can have more interactions between characters and create more diverse characters, more back stories, more love triangles." The initial season had 14 regular speaking roles that received star billing. Matthew Fox played the protagonist, a troubled surgeon named Jack Shephard. Evangeline Lilly portrayed a fugitive Kate Austen. Jorge Garcia played Hugo "Hurley" Reyes, an unlucky lottery winner. Josh Holloway played a con man, James "Sawyer" Ford. Ian Somerhalder played Boone Carlyle, chief operating officer of his mother's wedding business. Maggie Grace played his stepsister Shannon Rutherford, a former dance teacher. Harold Perrineau portrayed construction worker and aspiring artist Michael Dawson, while Malcolm David Kelley played his young son, Walt Lloyd. Terry O'Quinn played the mysterious John Locke. Naveen Andrews portrayed former Iraqi Republican Guard Sayid Jarrah. Emilie de Ravin played a young Australian mother-to-be, Claire Littleton. Yunjin Kim played Sun-Hwa Kwon, the daughter of a powerful Korean businessman and mobster, with Daniel Dae Kim as her husband and father's enforcer Jin-Soo Kwon. Dominic Monaghan played English ex-rock star drug addict Charlie Pace.

Boone was written out near the end of season one, and Kelley became a guest star making occasional appearances throughout season two. Shannon's departure eight episodes into season two made way for newcomers Mr. Eko, a Nigerian fake Catholic priest and former criminal played by Adewale Akinnuoye-Agbaje; Ana Lucia Cortez, an airport security guard and former police officer played by Michelle Rodriguez; and Libby Smith, a purported clinical psychologist and formerly mentally ill woman portrayed by Cynthia Watros. In season three, two actors were promoted from recurring to starring roles: Henry Ian Cusick as former Scottish soldier Desmond Hume, and Michael Emerson as the  manipulative leader of the Others, Ben Linus. In addition, three new actors joined the regular cast: Elizabeth Mitchell, as fertility doctor and Other Juliet Burke, and Kiele Sanchez and Rodrigo Santoro as background survivor couple Nikki Fernandez and Paulo. Several characters died throughout the season; Eko was written out early on when Akinnuoye-Agbaje did not wish to continue on the show, Nikki and Paulo were buried alive mid-season after poor fan response, and Charlie was written out in the third-season finale. Jeremy Davies as Daniel Faraday, a nervous physicist who takes a scientific interest in the island; Ken Leung as Miles Straume, a sarcastic supposed ghost whisperer, and Rebecca Mader as Charlotte Staples Lewis, a hard-headed and determined anthropologist and successful academic joined the cast in season four.

Numerous supporting characters have been given expansive and recurring appearances in the progressive storyline. Danielle Rousseau (Mira Furlan), a French member of an earlier scientific expedition to the island first encountered as a voice recording in the pilot episode, appears throughout the series; she is searching for her daughter, who later turns up in the form of Alex Rousseau (Tania Raymonde). Cindy (Kimberley Joseph), an Oceanic flight attendant who first appeared in the pilot, survived the crash and subsequently became one of the Others. In the second season, married couple Rose Henderson (L. Scott Caldwell) and Bernard Nadler (Sam Anderson), separated on opposite sides of the island (she with the main characters, he with the tail section survivors) were featured in a flashback episode after being reunited. Corporate magnate Charles Widmore (Alan Dale) has connections to both Ben and Desmond. Desmond is in love with Widmore's daughter Penelope "Penny" Widmore (Sonya Walger). The introduction of the Others featured Tom aka Mr. Friendly (M. C. Gainey) and Ethan Rom (William Mapother) all of whom have been shown in both flashbacks and the ongoing story. Jack's father Christian Shephard (John Terry) has appeared in multiple flashbacks of various characters. In the third season, Naomi Dorrit (Marsha Thomason), parachutes onto the island, the team leader of a group hired by Widmore to find Ben Linus. One member of her team includes the ruthless mercenary Martin Keamy (Kevin Durand). In the finale episode "The End", recurring guest stars Sam Anderson, L. Scott Caldwell, Francois Chau, Fionnula Flanagan, Sonya Walger, and John Terry were credited under the "starring" rubric alongside the principal cast. The mysterious, black, smoke cloud-like entity known as "the Monster" appeared in human form during season five and six as a middle-aged man dressed in black robes known as "The Man in Black" played by Titus Welliver, and in season six, it appears in the form of John Locke played by O'Quinn in a dual role. His rival, Jacob, was played by Mark Pellegrino.



Appearances

Notes
A  Anderson, Caldwell, Chau, Davies, Flanagan, Grace, Mader, Mitchell, Monaghan, Somerhalder, Terry, Walger and Watros are credited as starring in the series finale "The End".
B  Kelley, M'Cormack, O'Quinn, Raymonde and Terry also portray the Monster taking the form of their character.
C  Beaumon, Connolly, Evans, Farman, Henssens, Lee, Obileye, Obileye Jr., Shada and Shada portray younger versions of characters.
D  Toledo's role is named Nurse Tyra in season six's "Happily Ever After".

References

External links 
 Full cast and crew of Lost on the Internet Movie Database

Lost
Lost